Kammerchor Carmina Mundi is a professional chamber choir based in Aachen, Germany. The choir was founded in 1983 by Harald Nickoll who remains its director to this day. The ensemble's repertoire covers sacred and secular choral works from a wide range of time periods and cultures, but mainly within the a cappella literature. The ensemble has won several national and international competitions including the Bundeschorwettbewerb (German federal competition) in 2006. The choir has toured throughout Europe and in South America and has made a number of commercial recordings.

Discography 
 1990 – J.S.Bach - Matthäus-Passion
 1991 – Hugo Distler - Mörike-Chorliederbuch Vol. 1
 1993 – Hugo Distler - Mörike-Chorliederbuch Vol. 2
 1995 – Chormusik im 20. Jahrhundert
 1997 – Hugo Distler - Neues Chorliederbuch
 1998 – G.F.Händel - Dixit Dominus
 1999 – Europäische Chormusik
 2001 – ex oriente lux
 2004 – a cappella extra
 2009 – Favourite Choir Songs No. 1

Sources
Biography of Kammerchor Carmina Mundi at bach-cantatas.com

External links
Official Website of Kammerchor Carmina Mundi

German choirs
Chamber choirs
Musical groups established in 1983